Edvin Hodžić (29 November 1994 – 10 July 2018) was an Austrian professional footballer who played as a midfielder.

Career
Hodžić played at youth level for LASK Linz from 2002 to 2010. He then played for various clubs in Austria - FC Pasching, SV Wallern, SC Ritzing, ATSV Stadl-Paura, Austria Klagenfurt and Kapfenberger SV. At the time of his death he had been contracted to German club SV Schalding-Heining for five weeks.

Death
Hodžić died on 10 July 2018, at the age of 23. At the time of his death he was contracted to German club SV Schalding-Heining, and had played in a friendly game for the team two days before his death. The new season was due to start a few days after his death, but was cancelled.

References

1994 births
2018 deaths
Austrian footballers
LASK players
FC Juniors OÖ players
SV Wallern players
SC Ritzing players
ATSV Stadl-Paura players
FC Kärnten players
Kapfenberger SV players
SV Schalding-Heining players
Austrian Regionalliga players
2. Liga (Austria) players
Association football midfielders
Austrian expatriate footballers
Austrian expatriate sportspeople in Germany
Expatriate footballers in Germany